Statistics of Kyrgyzstan League for the 2005 season.

Overview
It was contested by 8 teams, and Dordoi-Dynamo Naryn won the championship. Al Fagir Aravan withdrew after playing 4 matches and started playing at the Kyrgyzstan League Second Level. Remaining matches of the first quarter of the season were awarded 0-3 defeats against them

League standings

Championship play off
Dordoi-Dynamo Naryn 1-1 (pen 4-2) Shoro SKA Bishkek

References
Kyrgyzstan - List of final tables (RSSSF)

Kyrgyzstan League seasons
1
Kyrgyzstan
Kyrgyzstan